A soufflé is a light, fluffy, baked dish made with egg yolks. It may also refer to:
 Soufflé (cookware), a ramekin for soufflés
 Souffle (heart sound), medical term
 Soufflé (programming language), a logic programming language influenced by Datalog
 Souffles (magazine), Moroccan quarterly magazine of the 1960s
 Lemon Souffle, a racehorse
 Lofty's Roach Souffle, music album by Harry Connick, Jr.

See also
 Le deuxième souffle (disambiguation)